A Game of War is a book by Guy Debord and Alice Becker-Ho that illustrates a game devised by Debord by giving a detailed account of one of their table-top conflicts. It was first published in French as Le Jeu de la Guerre in 1987, but unsold copies were later pulped in 1991, along with other books by Debord, at his insistence when he left his publisher Champ libre. The book was reissued in 2006, with an English translation published by Atlas Press in 2008.

In his 1989 book Panegyric, Guy Debord remarked:
So I have studied the logic of war. Indeed I succeeded long ago in representing its essential movements on a rather simple game-board… I played this game, and in the often difficult conduct of my life drew a few lessons from it — setting rules for my life, and abiding by them. The surprises vouchsafed by this Kriegspiel of mine seem endless; I rather fear it may turn out to be the only one of my works to which people will venture to accord any value. As to whether I have made good use of its lessons, I shall leave that for others to judge.

Apart from the books which contain the game, free online versions of the game are available.

London based group, Class Wargames have reproduced A Game of War and taken it on a campaign around the globe, at Belo Horizonte, pictured above, St. Petersburg and a variety of other locations.

Play 
The basics of the game are close to those of chess, in that it is based on war and the strategy that surrounds it.

Two players take turns moving troops across the board. Each player can move up to 5 troops each turn and is allowed 1 attack. Attacking is decided by summing all the offensive power in the range of an enemy target square. Then subtracting the total defensive power of the other player. If this number is greater than 2 then the attack is a success. Power is added from all the attacking pieces in a straight line either vertical horizontal or diagonally to the attacking square. The game board has natural obstructions that simulate the different terrain on a battlefield. The winner either defeats all their opponent's troops, or destroys their arsenals.

When making the game Guy Debord said there were only three things that stopped his game from being 100% accurate and those were climate conditions and the cycles of day and night; the influence of troop morale; and uncertainty about the exact positions and movements of the enemy. The game and book of the same name did not receive much success but a copy can still be bought today.

See also
 Three-sided football

References

External links
Kriegspiel, Alex Galloway's app version of Le Jeu de la Guerre.
Battle of 1815 - Waterloo, another free online version of Guy Debort's Kriegsspiel
Game (article), Totality.tv, Sunday, April 13, 2008. Originally published in McKenzie Wark, 50 Year of Recuperation: The Situationist International, Princeton Architectural Press, 2008
Class Wargames Presents Guy Debord's The Game of War (film), Class Wargames 2009.

1987 books
Wargames introduced in the 1980s
Works by Guy Debord